Switzerland competed at the 2004 Summer Paralympics in Athens, Greece. The team included 41 athletes, 27 men and 14 women. Competitors from Switzerland won 16 medals, including 2 gold, 6 silver and 8 bronze to finish 40th in the medal table.

Medallists

Sports

Archery

Men

|-
|align=left|Robert Lehner
|align=left|Men's individual W1
|603
|8
|N/A
|L 155-160
|colspan=4|did not advance
|}

Athletics

Men's track

Men's field

Women's track

Cycling

Men's road

Men's track

Women's road

Women's track

Equestrian

Shooting

Men

Swimming

Women

Table tennis

Men

Women

Wheelchair tennis

Men

Women

See also
Switzerland at the Paralympics
Switzerland at the 2004 Summer Olympics

References 

Nations at the 2004 Summer Paralympics
2004
Summer Paralympics